Wojciech Julian Włodarczyk (born 28 October 1990) is a Polish volleyball player. At the professional club level, he plays for LUK Lublin.

Career

Clubs
In 2013 went to one of the best clubs in Poland - PGE Skra Bełchatów. In season 2013/2014 won with this team title of Polish Champion.  On October 8, 2014 his team won ENEA Polish SuperCup 2014. On May 6, 2015 he won with PGE Skra Bełchatów bronze medal of Polish Championship. Then signed a contract with MKS Cuprum Lubin. In season 2016/17 he was one of the main player in Indykpol AZS Olsztyn and his club took 5th place in PlusLiga. On April 27, 2017 he signed two-year contract with ONICO Warszawa.

National team
He won a silver medal of Universiade 2013. Włodarczyk was appointed to the Poland men's national volleyball team first time by head coach Andrea Anastasi in 2013. He was in squad on World League 2013. On August 14, 2015 he achieved bronze of European League. His national team won 3rd place match with Estonia (3–0).

Honours

Clubs
 National championships
 2012/2013  Austrian Championship, with SK Posojilnica Aich/Dob
 2013/2014  Polish Championship, with PGE Skra Bełchatów
 2014/2015  Polish SuperCup, with PGE Skra Bełchatów

Universiade
 2013  Summer Universiade

References

External links

 
 Player profile at LegaVolley.it 
 Player profile at PlusLiga.pl 
 Player profile at Volleybox.net

1990 births
Living people
People from Andrychów
Sportspeople from Lesser Poland Voivodeship
Polish men's volleyball players
Universiade medalists in volleyball
Universiade silver medalists for Poland
Medalists at the 2013 Summer Universiade
Polish expatriate sportspeople in Austria
Expatriate volleyball players in Austria
Polish expatriate sportspeople in Italy
Expatriate volleyball players in Italy
Projekt Warsaw players
AZS Olsztyn players
BBTS Bielsko-Biała players
Skra Bełchatów players
Cuprum Lubin players
Czarni Radom players
LKPS Lublin players
Outside hitters